CGU may be:
 Office of the Inspector General (Brazil), abbreviated CGU in Portuguese
 Chang Gung University in Taiwan
 Christelijk Gymnasium Utrecht
 Claremont Graduate University in California in the United States
 Compostela Group of Universities, a European university network
 CGU plc, a British insurance company
 CGU Insurance, an Australian insurance company
 a codon for the amino acid arginine
 a cash generating unit, an IFRS accounting term